Carl Davis Drumond (born 9 February 1975) is a Costa Rican professional boxer who has challenged once for a world heavyweight title.

Professional career
Drumond made his professional debut in February 2005, stopping Miguel Osorio in the first round in Limón, Costa Rica.

Upon winning all his first 26 matches (one win was over former IBF-cruiserweight-champion Kelvin Davis (boxer)) Drumond challenged Ruslan Chagaev for the WBA heavyweight title on (7 February 2009). Chagaev won on technical decision after Drumond accidentally head-butted him twice in the third and fourth rounds, leaving Chagaev with a cut on his left eye. The referee decided to stop the fight after the sixth round as blood was coming out of that cut Chagaev sustained. The judges all had Chagaev in front on the scorecards, so he was declared the winner according to WBA-rules. He lost his next fight against Derric Rossy on 31 July 2009 by unanimous decision.

Professional boxing record

|-
|align="center" colspan=8|27 Wins (21 knockouts, 6 decisions), 3 Losses (1 knockout, 2 decisions) 
|-
| align="center" style="border-style: none none solid solid; background: #e3e3e3"|Result
| align="center" style="border-style: none none solid solid; background: #e3e3e3"|Record
| align="center" style="border-style: none none solid solid; background: #e3e3e3"|Opponent
| align="center" style="border-style: none none solid solid; background: #e3e3e3"|Type
| align="center" style="border-style: none none solid solid; background: #e3e3e3"|Round
| align="center" style="border-style: none none solid solid; background: #e3e3e3"|Date
| align="center" style="border-style: none none solid solid; background: #e3e3e3"|Location
| align="center" style="border-style: none none solid solid; background: #e3e3e3"|Notes
|-align=center
|Win
|
|align=left| Henry Saenz
|KO
|1
|3 Nov 2011
|align=left| Zapote District, San José, Costa Rica
|align=left|
|-
|Loss
|
|align=left| Odlanier Solis
|RTD
|3
|20 Mar 2010
|align=left| Key West, Florida, U.S.
|align=left|
|-
|Loss
|
|align=left| Derric Rossy
|UD
|10
|31 Jul 2009
|align=left| Hollywood, Florida, U.S.
|align=left|
|-
|Loss
|
|align=left| Ruslan Chagaev
|TD
|6
|7 Feb 2009
|align=left| Rostock, Germany
|align=left|
|-
|Win
|
|align=left| Alejandro Agustin Alvarez
|KO
|1
|30 Jun 2008
|align=left| San José, Costa Rica
|align=left|
|-
|Win
|
|align=left| Luis Andres Pineda
|UD
|10
|19 Apr 2008
|align=left| San José, Costa Rica
|align=left|
|-
|Win
|
|align=left| Edegar Da Silva
|KO
|1
|31 Jan 2008
|align=left| San José, Costa Rica
|align=left|
|-
|Win
|
|align=left| Kelvin "Concrete" Davis
|UD
|10
|17 Nov 2007
|align=left| San José, Costa Rica
|align=left|
|-
|Win
|
|align=left| Saul Farah
|KO
|2
|15 Oct 2007
|align=left| San José, Costa Rica
|align=left|
|-
|Win
|
|align=left| Sedreck "Big Buck" Fields
|UD
|8
|30 Jul 2007
|align=left| San José, Costa Rica
|align=left|
|-
|Win
|
|align=left| Adenilson Rodrigues
|TKO
|3
|30 Apr 2007
|align=left| San José, Costa Rica
|align=left|
|-
|Win
|
|align=left| Walter "Litron" Palacios
|TKO
|5
|12 Feb 2007
|align=left| San José, Costa Rica
|align=left|
|-
|Win
|
|align=left| Arcenio Cuestas
|KO
|2
|20 Nov 2006
|align=left| San José, Costa Rica
|align=left|
|-
|Win
|
|align=left| Ramon Hayes
|UD
|8
|13 Oct 2006
|align=left| Hollywood, Florida, U.S.
|align=left|
|-
|Win
|
|align=left| Mariano Ramon "Chiquito" Ocampo
|UD
|10
|18 Sep 2006
|align=left| San José, Costa Rica
|align=left|
|-
|Win
|
|align=left| Milton Rodriguez
|KO
|1
|19 Aug 2006
|align=left| Limón, Costa Rica
|align=left|
|-
|Win
|
|align=left| David "El Nene" Orozco
|KO
|1
|18 Jul 2006
|align=left| San José, Costa Rica
|align=left|
|-
|Win
|
|align=left| Walter Palacios
|UD
|8
|29 May 2006
|align=left| San José, Costa Rica
|align=left|
|-
|Win
|
|align=left| Ambar Loboa
|KO
|2
|30 Apr 2006
|align=left| San José, Costa Rica
|align=left|
|-
|Win
|
|align=left| Arcenio Cuestas
|KO
|2
|20 Mar 2006
|align=left| San José, Costa Rica
|align=left|
|-
|Win
|
|align=left| Lester Vargas
|KO
|2
|28 Feb 2006
|align=left| San José, Costa Rica
|align=left|
|-
|Win
|
|align=left| Lester Vargas
|KO
|5
|11 Dec 2005
|align=left| Heredia, Costa Rica
|align=left|
|-
|Win
|
|align=left| Olger Castro
|KO
|1
|17 Nov 2005
|align=left| San José, Costa Rica
|align=left|
|-
|Win
|
|align=left| Juan Luis Gonzalez
|KO
|2
|16 Oct 2005
|align=left| San José, Costa Rica
|align=left|
|-
|Win
|
|align=left| Armando Sune
|KO
|1
|16 Sep 2005
|align=left| San José, Costa Rica
|align=left|
|-
|Win
|
|align=left| Juan Luis Gonzalez
|KO
|1
|14 Aug 2005
|align=left| San José, Costa Rica
|align=left|
|-
|Win
|
|align=left| Marvin Aguilar
|TKO
|1
|27 Jul 2005
|align=left| San José, Costa Rica
|align=left|
|-
|Win
|
|align=left| Rene Lopez
|TKO
|1
|30 May 2005
|align=left| San José, Costa Rica
|align=left|
|-
|Win
|
|align=left| Jose Palacios
|KO
|1
|28 Mar 2005
|align=left| San José, Costa Rica
|align=left|
|-
|Win
|
|align=left| Miguel Osorio
|KO
|1
|19 Feb 2005
|align=left| Limón, Costa Rica
|align=left|
|}

References

External links
 

1975 births
Living people
People from Limón Province
Costa Rican male boxers
Heavyweight boxers